Robert Cotton may refer to:

Robert Cotton (died 1559), MP for Leicester
Sir Robert Cotton, 1st Baronet, of Connington (1571–1631), English antiquary and creator of the Cotton Library
Sir Robert Cotton, 1st Baronet, of Combermere (c. 1635–1712), MP for Cheshire
Robert Cotton (MP) (1644–1717), English politician
Sir Robert Cotton, 5th Baronet, of Connington (c. 1669–1749) of the Cotton baronets
Sir Robert Cotton, 3rd Baronet, of Combermere (1695–1748), MP for Cheshire and Lostwithiel
Sir Robert Salusbury Cotton, 5th Baronet, of Combermere (c. 1739–1809), MP for Cheshire
Robert Cotton (cricketer) (1909–1979), English cricketer
 Robert Bell Cotton (1859–1917), member of the Mississippi House of Representatives
Sir Bob Cotton (1915–2006), Australian Federal Senator
Bob Cotton (basketball) (1920–1999), American basketball player

See also
Cotton (disambiguation)